Rubus mortensenii is a species of flowering plant in the family Rosaceae.

Description 

Rubus mortensenii has sharply angular reddish turions with thorns from 2–4 mm long. The limb has regular rounded teeth. The final leaflet has a clearly distinct apex, long and thin, around 15 mm. Its upper face has between 5-100 hairs per cm2. Its lower face meanwhile, is greyish-green to gray in color. The bright pink flowers are eight to ten millimeters long.

Distribution and habitat 
It is native to Sweden, Denmark and Germany. The species is common, occurring on non-calcareous soil, in thickets, clearings and the edges of wood.

See also  
 Jardins de Valloires, the French national conservation centre for Rubus

References

Further reading 
Weber, H.E., 1995 - Rubus L. in G. Hegi : Illustrierte Flora von Mitteleuropa, IV/2A ed. 3.

mortensenii
Plants described in 1889
Flora of Denmark
Flora of Germany
Flora of Sweden